Qəribli or Garibli or Garibly or Gyaribli may refer to:
Qəribli, Agdash, Azerbaijan
Qəribli, Tovuz, Azerbaijan